The Electoral district of Point Cook is an electoral district of the Victorian Legislative Assembly in Australia. It was created in the redistribution of electoral boundaries in 2021, and will come into effect at the 2022 Victorian state election.

It largely covers the area of the abolished district of Altona, covering south western suburbs of Melbourne. It includes the suburbs of Altona Meadows, Seabrook, Point Cook, and Werribee South.

The abolished seat of Altona was held by Labor MP Jill Hennessy from 2010 to 2022.

Members for Point Cook

Election results

See also

Parliaments of the Australian states and territories
List of members of the Victorian Legislative Assembly

References

Point Cook, Electoral district of
2022 establishments in Australia
City of Hobsons Bay
City of Wyndham
Electoral districts and divisions of Greater Melbourne